Julia Wu may refer to:
 Julia Wu (table tennis)
 Julia Wu (singer)